Vladimir Samoylov (born 20 May 1876, date of death unknown) was a fencer from the Russian Empire. He competed in the individual foil event at the 1912 Summer Olympics.

References

External links
 

1876 births
Year of death missing
Male fencers from the Russian Empire
Olympic competitors for the Russian Empire
Fencers at the 1912 Summer Olympics